Men, Microscopes, and Living Things is a children's book written by the American author Katherine Shippen and illustrated by Anthony Ravielli. The book was first published in 1955 and is a 1956 Newbery Honor recipient.

Overview
Shippen traces the history of biological thought beginning with Aristotle and followed by Pliny, Linnaeus, Cuvier, Lamarck, Darwin, and several others. The book is 190 pages including a 7-page index.

References

1955 children's books
Children's non-fiction books
American children's books
Newbery Honor-winning works
Biology books
Books about scientists